Smash The Octopus, released in 2003 (see 2003 in music), was the first studio album by US rock band Flattbush.

Track listing
"Smash The Octopus" (Ramon B. Enriko M. Arman M. Eric L.)
"Better Off Dead" (Enriko M. Eric L.Ramon B. Arman M.)
"Kontra'Tado" (Enriko M. Eric L. Ramon B. Arman M.)
"Question Authority" (Enriko M. Eric L. Ramon B. Arman M.)
"Foxhole" (Eric L. Ramon B. Enriko M. Arman M.)
"Napalm" (Enriko M. Eric L. Ramon B. Arman M.)
"Batas Militar [Salvage Style]" (Ramon B. Enriko M. Arman M. Eric L.)
"Expose And Oppose" (Ramon B. Enriko M. Arman M. Eric L.)
"GMA is a US-SOB" (Ramon B. Enriko M. Arman M. Bradley W. Eric L.)
"Death Squad" (Ramon B. Enriko M. Arman M. Eric L.)
"PIGS" (Ramon B. Enriko M. Arman M. Bradley W. Eric L.)
"LIC Total War [Low Intensity Conflict]" (Eric L. Ramon B. Enriko M. Arman M.)
"Red Light District" (Arman M.)

Guitars Written By Eric Long, Except #9 & #11 By Bradley Walther and Eric Long

Credits
 Ramon Banda - drums
 Arman Maniago - bass guitar
 Bradley Walther - guitar
 Enriko Maniago - vocals

2003 albums